Patrick Henry Hays (born January 8, 1947) is an American lawyer and politician from the state of Arkansas. A member of the Democratic Party, Hays served in the Arkansas House of Representatives from 1987 to 1989 and as the mayor of North Little Rock from 1989 to 2013.

Early life
Hays was born in North Little Rock, Arkansas in 1947. He graduated from North Little Rock High School, and then attended the University of Arkansas at Fayetteville, where he obtained his bachelor's degree. He received his Juris Doctor from the University of Arkansas School of Law. Hays joined the United States Army Reserves, reaching the rank of captain.

Career
Hays served as Assistant City Attorney for North Little Rock. He was elected to the Arkansas House of Representatives in the 66th district for the 76th Arkansas General Assembly, which was in session from 1987 through 1989. He was then elected mayor of North Little Rock, and served six terms, from 1989 through 2013, totaling 24 years. During his tenure as mayor, he pushed for a one cent sales tax to fund the construction of Dickey-Stephens Park. He also oversaw the development of the Big Dam Bridge, Clinton Park Bridge, Broadway Bridge, and Burns Park. Hays briefly ran for the United States Senate following the retirement of Dale Bumpers in the 1998 election, but he withdrew his candidacy. Hays did not seek reelection as mayor in 2012.

Hays announced his candidacy for the House of Representatives to succeed Republican incumbent Tim Griffin in the 2014 election on October 22, 2013. He cited the United States federal government shutdown of 2013, which he called a "travesty", as a reason to run. Republican French Hill defeated Hays in the general election.

Personal
Hays' wife, Linda, is a retired school teacher. They have a daughter, Josie, and three grandchildren, Savannah, Isabella, and Harper.

References

External links

 

Living people
Politicians from North Little Rock, Arkansas
University of Arkansas alumni
Mayors of places in Arkansas
Democratic Party members of the Arkansas House of Representatives
United States Army reservists
Arkansas lawyers
University of Arkansas School of Law alumni
1947 births